Bellairs and Bellair are surnames. Notable people with the surnames include:

 Angus Bellairs (1918–1990), British herpetologist and anatomist
 Bart Bellairs (born 1956), American basketball coach
 Carlyon Bellairs (1871–1955), British Royal Navy officer
 Edmund Bellairs (1823–1898), New Zealand legislator
 George Bellairs (1902–1985, English crime writer
 John Bellairs (1938–1991), American author
 Mal Bellairs (1919–2010), American radio and television personality
 Nona Bellairs (1828–1897), British author
 William Bellairs (1823–1913), British army officer
Bellair
 Thomas Smith Bellair (1825–1893), Australian actor and publican

Fictional characters
 Sweet Kitty Bellairs, title character of American musical comedy
 Sweet Kitty Bellairs (1916 film), title character of American silent film

See also
 Bellairs Research Institute on the island of Barbados
Bellair (disambiguation)
Belair (disambiguation)
Bel Air (disambiguation)
Bel-Aire (disambiguation)
Belleair (disambiguation)
Bellaire (disambiguation)